Raphitoma pupoides is a species of sea snail, a marine gastropod mollusk in the family Raphitomidae.

Description
The length of the shell varies between 6 mm and 17 mm.

(Original description) It stands out at a glance for its pupoid shape and for its very short siphonal canal, a strongly denticled aperture, oblique and obsolete cross-linking, rapid subtraction, tumid evolutions. The conical apex is composed of many rounded corners, the last of which at angled periphery.

Distribution
This species occurs in the Central Mediterranean Sea and the Canary Islands.

References

 Riccardo Giannuzzi-Savelli, Francesco Pusateri, Riccardo Giannuzzi-Savelli, Riccardo Giannuzzi: A revision of the Mediterranean Raphitomidae, 3: on the Raphitoma pupoides (Monterosato, 1884) complex, with the description of a new species (Mollusca Gastropoda); Biodiversity Journal, 2016, 7 (1): 103–115

External links
 Scacchi, A. (1836). Catalogus Conchyliorum regni Neapolitani. Neapoli [Naples, Typis Filiatre-Sebetii 18 p., 1 pl]
 Gastropods.com: Raphitoma (pupoides
 

pupoides
Gastropods described in 1884